Lewis Atterbury  may refer to:

Lewis Atterbury the elder (died 1693),  English clergyman
Lewis Atterbury (chaplain) (1656–1731), English churchman and chaplain, son of the above

See also
Lewis Atterbury Stimson (1844–1917),  American surgeon